Three Stooges Scrapbook is an unaired 1960 television pilot starring The Three Stooges (Moe Howard, Larry Fine and Curly-Joe DeRita). In the opening title and Hollywood trade ads, the show's title is spelled without "The," including a promotional photograph of the Stooges holding an oversized scrapbook. The pilot featured the slapstick trio getting evicted from a rooming house for cooking in their apartment, looking for a new place to live, finding refuge in the home of a mad inventor (played by Emil Sitka), and presenting an animated short called The Spain Mutiny that imagines the funnymen as part of Christopher Columbus’ crew.

Three Stooges Scrapbook was filmed in color and produced by Norman Maurer (Moe Howard’s son-in-law), who hoped to establish a weekly program for children’s television. When no network wanted to pursue the project as a series, Maurer divided the pilot into two short films that were released to theaters in 1963. Maurer also reprinted the live action scenes in black-and-white and incorporated them into the 1962 feature film The Three Stooges in Orbit.

To date, the original pilot has never been released on home media.

Cast
 Moe Howard as Moe
 Larry Fine as Larry
 Joe DeRita as Curly-Joe
 Emil Sitka as Prof. Dolottle
 Marjorie Eaton as Mrs. McGinnis 
 Don Lamond as Announcer/Stage Manager
 Edward Innes as Landlord
 Albert Grazier as Butler

Credits
 Director: Sidney Miller
 Writer: Elwood Ullman
 Producer: Norman Maurer
 Starring: Larry Fine, Moe Howard, Joe DeRita
 Featuring: Emil Sitka, Marjorie Eaton, Don Lamond, Edward Innes, Albert Grazier
 Music Composer and Conductor: Paul Dunlap
 Title Song: George Dunning (music) and Stanley Styne (lyrics)
 Vocals: The Eligibles
 Director of Photography: Hal McAlpin
 Film Editor: Chuck Gladden
 Assistant Director: Harry Slott
 Chief Electrician: Robert Petzoldt
 Sound Recorder: Leon Leon
 Property Master: Chick Chicetti
 Set Decorator: Frank Lombardo
 Script Supervisor: Joe Franklin 
 Makeup: Ted Coodley
 Costumer: Jack Angel
 Grip: Tex Hayes
 Laboratory: Consolidated Film Industries
 Sound: Glen Glenn
 Costume Designer: Sascha Brastoff

Book
The Three Stooges Scrapbook is also the title of a 1982 book written by Stooge experts Jeff and Greg Lenburg and Joan Howard Maurer (Moe Howard's daughter and Norman Maurer's wife).

See also

 Kook's Tour - another unbroadcast Three Stooges pilot from 1970 that was released initially through the home movie market and later on VHS and DVD.

References

External links
 

The Three Stooges
Unaired television pilots
Television pilots not picked up as a series